Whale Rock Light was a sparkplug lighthouse marking Whale Rock, a dangerous island in the entrance to the West Passage of Narragansett Bay in Washington County, Rhode Island.

The rock is now marked by Whale Rock Lighted Gong Buoy 3.

History
The lighthouse was built on the rock in 1882.

It was destroyed in the New England hurricane of 1938 when it was dislodged from its foundation, killing keeper Walter Eberle.

Part of the lighthouse foundation remains and the remains of the lighthouse are underwater nearby.

References

Lighthouses in Washington County, Rhode Island
Narragansett Bay
Lighthouses completed in 1882
1882 establishments in Rhode Island
1938 disestablishments in Rhode Island